The tench or doctor fish (Tinca tinca) is a fresh- and brackish-water fish of the order Cypriniformes found throughout Eurasia from Western Europe including the British Isles east into Asia as far as the Ob and Yenisei Rivers. It is also found in Lake Baikal. It normally inhabits slow-moving freshwater habitats, particularly lakes and lowland rivers.

Taxonomy 
The tench was formerly classified in the subfamily Leuciscinae with other Eurasian minnows, but more recent phylogenetic studies have supported it belonging to its own family Tincidae.

Ecology
The tench is most often found in still waters with a clay or muddy substrate and abundant vegetation. This species is rare in clear waters across stony substrate, and is absent altogether from fast-flowing streams. It tolerates water with a low oxygen concentration, being found in waters where even the carp cannot survive.

Tench feed mostly at night with a preference for animals, such as chironomids, on the bottom of eutrophic waters and snails and pea clams in well-vegetated waters.

Breeding takes place in shallow water usually among aquatic plants where the sticky green eggs can be deposited. Spawning usually occurs in summer, and as many as 300,000 eggs may be produced. Growth is rapid, and fish may reach a weight of 0.11 kg (0.25 lb) within the first year.

Morphology
Tench have a stocky, carp-like shape and olive-green skin, darker above and almost golden below. The tail fin is square in shape. The other fins are distinctly rounded in shape. The mouth is rather narrow and provided at each corner with a very small barbel. Maximum size is 70 cm, though most specimens are much smaller. A record fish caught in 2001 in England had a weight of 15 lb 3 oz (6.89 kg). The eyes are small and red-orange in colour. Sexual dimorphism is absent or weak, limited to the adult females having a more convex ventral profile when compared with males.

Males may also possess a very thick and flattened outer ray to the ventral fins. Males are generally smaller than females, but can be recognised by having more curved lower fins and noticeable muscles around the base of the fins generally absent in female.

The tench has very small scales, which are deeply embedded in a thick skin, making it as slippery as an eel. Folklore has it that this slime cured any sick fish that rubbed against it, and from this belief arose the name doctor fish.

Golden tench
An artificially bred variety of tench called the golden tench  is a popular ornamental fish for ponds. This form varies in colour from pale gold through to dark red, and some fish have black or red spots on the flanks and fins. Though somewhat similar to the goldfish, because these fish have such small scales, their quality is rather different.

Economic significance
Tench are edible, working well in recipes that would otherwise call for carp, but are rarely eaten these days. They are shoaling fish that are popular quarries for coarse angling in rivers, lakes and canals. Tench, particularly golden tench, are also kept as ornamental fish in ponds as they are bottom feeders that help to keep the waterways clean and healthy.

Angling
Large tench may be found in gravel pits or deep, slow-moving waters with a clayey or silty bottom and copious aquatic vegetation. The best methods and bait to catch tench are float fishing and ledgering with a swim feeder using maggots, sweetcorn, pellets, bread, and worms. Fish over 1 kg (2 lb) in weight are very strong fighters when caught on a rod.

References

Fishkeeping
Recreational fishing
Cyprinid fish of Europe
Cyprinid fish of Asia
Fish of Russia
Fish described in 1758
Taxa named by Carl Linnaeus
Tincinae
Tinca